Dae Joyeong (died 719) (or  in Korean) or Da Zuorong (大祚榮, 大祚荣, in Chinese), also known as King Go (in Korean; Gao in Chinese), established the state of Balhae, reigning from 699 to 719.

Life

Early life 
Dae Joyeong was the first son of general Dae Jung-sang, who was also known as Sari Geolgeol Jungsang (Hangul: 사리걸걸중상, Hanja: 舍利乞乞仲象) or Dae Geolgeol Jungsang (Hangul: 대걸걸중상, Hanja: 大乞乞仲象). 

Historical sources give different accounts of Dae Joyeong's ethnicity and background. Among the official dynastic history works, the New Book of Tang refers to Dae Joyeong and his state as Sumo Mohe (related to Jurchens and later Manchus) affiliated with Goguryeo. The Old Book of Tang also states Dae's ethnic background as Mohe but adds that he was "高麗別種" (gaoli biezhong). The term is interpreted as meaning "a branch of the Goguryeo people" by South and North Korean historians, but as "distinct from Goguryeo" by Japanese and Chinese researchers. The Samguk yusa, a 13th-century collection of Korean history and legends, describes Dae as a Sumo Mohe leader. However, it gives another account of Dae being a former Goguryeo general, citing a now-lost Sillan record. Alexander Kim considers this unlikely since Goguryeo fell in 668 while Dae died in 719, and young men could not receive the rank of general.

King of Jin (Zhen) and Balhae 
The Wu Zhou killed Geolsa Biu, and Dae Jung-sang also died. Dae Joyeong integrated the armies of Goguryeo people and some Mohe (Malgal) tribes and resisted Wu Zhou's attack. His victory over the Wu Zhou at the Battle of Tianmenling enabled him to expand his father's empire and claimed himself the King of Jin (Zhen)in 698. He established his capital at Dongmo Mountain in the south of today's Jilin province, and built a fortress, which was to become Zhen (Jin) kingdom's capital.

He attempted to expand his influence in foreign politics involving the Tang/ Wu Zhou, the Göktürks, the Khitan, Silla and some independent Mohe tribes. At first he dispatched an envoy to the Göktürks, allying against Tang/ Wu Zhou. Then he reconciled himself with the Tang when Emperor Zhongzong was restored to the throne.

In 712, he renamed his empire Balhae. In 713, he was given the titular title of "Prince of Commandery of Bohai (Balhae)" (渤海郡王) by Emperor Xuanzong. After a period of rest within the empire, King Go made it clear that Silla was not to be dealt with peacefully because they had allied with Tang to destroy Goguryeo, the predecessor of Balhae. This aggressive stance towards Silla was continued on by his son and successor King Mu of Balhae.

Dae Joyeong died in 719, and his son Dae Muye assumed the throne. Dae Joyeong was given the posthumous name "King Go."

Legacy 

After the fall of Balhae, Dae Gwang-hyeon, the last prince led many of the Balhae aristocracy into the Korean state, thus unifying the two successor states of Goguryeo. Dae Joyeong's descendants include modern-day Koreans who bear the surname Tae (태), or Dae (대).

In South Korea, a television drama on KBS1 was launched since September 2006 in his honor. Roughly 30% (based on 2007 survey) of the Korean viewers enjoyed this programme.

The third Chungmugong Yi Sun-sin class destroyer commissioned by the Republic of Korea Navy is named Dae Joyeong. KDX-II class destroyers are named after significant figures in Korean history such as admiral Yi Sun-sin.

The Chunbun Ancestral Rite is held annually in Balhae Village, Gyeongsaunbok-do in order to commemorate the achievements of Dae Joyeong. The Gyeongsan City mayor participates in the event, which is open for public participation.

In popular culture 
 Portrayed by Choi Soo-jong in the 2006-2007 KBS TV series Dae Jo Yeong.

See also 
Rulers of Korea

References

Bibliography

External links 
Portrait of Dae Joyoung (Korean)

7th-century births
719 deaths
Balhae rulers
Mohe peoples
Korean generals
8th-century rulers in Asia
Year of birth unknown
Founding monarchs